"Get Rhythm" is a song written and recorded by American singer-songwriter and musician Johnny Cash. It was originally released as the B-side to the single release "I Walk the Line" in 1956 on Sun 241.  It was re-released with overdubbed "live" effects in September 1969 as an A-side single and reached number 60 on the Billboard Pop chart.

Critical reception 
Alice Randall in the book My Country Roots: The Ultimate MP3 Guide to America's Original Outsider Music asks the question, "racist, racialist, or race appreciating? You decide. Maybe the grinning "boy" hides something worth knowing in his mask as well as behind his mask. Well maybe he was white trash. "

Chart performance
"Get Rhythm" was released in 1956  as the B-side to Cash's first #1 hit, "I Walk the Line." In 1969, the original recording of "Get Rhythm" was released as a single itself, with sound effects dubbed in to simulate the sound of a live recording. This rerelease went to #23 on the country charts.

Martin Delray version

 
In 1991, Martin Delray recorded a cover of the song on his debut album, also entitled Get Rhythm. Released as his debut single, Delray's version featured guest vocals from Cash, as well as a guest appearance by him in the music video. It peaked at #27 on the country charts.

Chart performance

Other cover versions
NRBQ first recorded a rock'n'roll arrangement of "Get Rhythm" on At Yankee Stadium, and again on 1982's Grooves in Orbit. In 1986 British pub rock band Dr. Feelgood released a cover on their album Brilleaux. Ry Cooder first recorded a cover version of Get Rhythm for his eleventh studio album entitled 'Get Rhythm', released in November 1987. It was also included on 'The Ry Cooder Anthology: The UFO Has Landed (October 2008)'

References

1969 singles
1991 singles
Johnny Cash songs
Martin Delray songs
Rock-and-roll songs
Rockabilly songs
Songs written by Johnny Cash
Song recordings produced by Sam Phillips
Sun Records singles
Atlantic Records singles
1969 songs